Panuganti China Sattilingam Devara, also known as P. C. S. Devara is an Indian atmospheric scientist and physicist. His work has focussed on lidar (light radar) technology, radio and optical remote sensing, climatology, atmospheric aerosols and climate dynamics. Devara has been the President of the Indian Aerosol Science and Technology Association (IASTA), India. Devara has been employed for thirty-five years at the Indian Institute of Tropical Meteorology (IITM), From 1990 to 2009, he was the director of the IITM in Pune and then became a scientific advisor to the organization. Devara has since become director of the Amity Centre of Oceanic-atmospheric Science and Technology (Amity COAST) at Amity University, Gurgaon.

Early life and education 
Devara received an undergraduate degree with first class honours in Physics from Andhra University. In 1974, he received his post-graduate degree in Physics from Andhra University. In 1979, Devara received a doctoral degree in Physics from Andhra University under the guidance of Iqhbal Ahmed..

Research and career 
Devara's work focussed on research into atmospheric optics and radiation, remote sensing, characterization of atmospheric aerosols and trace gases, and aerosol-cloud climate interactions. He has contributed to the development of optical and radar remote sensing techniques for the study of aerosols, trace gases and state variables, for understanding their role in weather and climate processes.

In 1979, Devara received a Young Scientist award from the Government of Andhra Pradesh Akademi of Sciences. In 1980, he joined IITM as a senior scientific officer and became head of the Physical Meteorology and Aerology (PM and A) Division. In 2005, he became acting director of IITM and served as an advisor until 2014.

Devara's work includes studies of aerosol-chemistry climate interactions; aerosol characterization; and mass-size distribution of black carbon.

In 2016, during the Odd-Even Campaign in New Delhi (where for two weeks, cars with even number plates could drive on even dates and vice versa) Devara led a team of students and scientists in collaboration with ARIES, Nainital and IITM-Delhi to assess the efficacy of the campaign.

Awards and recognition 
 Fellow of the Asian Aerosol Research Assembly (AARA) 2015.
 Golden Jubilee and Silver Jubilee Awards, IITM, Pune.
 Fellow of the Andhra Pradesh Akademi of Sciences (APAS), Hyderabad.
 Fellow of the Society of Earth Scientists (SES), India.
 Fellow of the Maharashtra Academy of Sciences (MASc).
 President of the Indian Aerosol Science and Technology Association (IASTA).

References 

Year of birth missing (living people)
Living people
Scientists from Andhra Pradesh